The Brookhill Tavern is a Grade II listed public house at 484 Alum Rock Road, Alum Rock, Birmingham, England B8 3HX.

It was built in 1927-1928 for the Smethwick-based Mitchells & Butlers Brewery. The architect was George Bernard Cox of Harrison and Cox.

It was Grade II listed in 2015 by Historic England.

References

Pubs in Birmingham, West Midlands
Grade II listed pubs in Birmingham